A Cuban passport is an identity document issued to citizens of Cuba to facilitate international travel. They are valid for 6 years from the date of issuance, but have to be extended every 2 years.

The cost of issue of this passport is about US$200 (CUC 200) and US$200 for every two years if one person lives in the United States.

In addition a Cuban national must pay 200 Euros every two years if the person lives outside of Cuba in order to gain permission to enter Cuba. Without this permission and a Cuban passport a Cuban cannot enter the island and will be denied entry.

Until 14 January 2013, the Cuban government required that all Cuban citizens and foreigners such as foreign students that live in Cuba desiring to leave the country would have to obtain an exit permit. The abolition of the controversial requirement led to long lines at passport offices filled with citizens desiring to legally travel abroad; however, the lines were partly attributed to the cost of obtaining a passport doubling the next day to the equivalent of US$100 (CUC 100), the equivalent of 5 months of average state salary. Now the passport is the only document required to leave the country, apart from a visa from the destination country. Previously the cost of a passport, exit permit, and associated paperwork added up to around  US$300 (CUC 300), the equivalent of 15 months of average state salary.

Passport message

Passports of many countries contain a message, nominally from the official who is in charge of passport issuance, addressed to authorities of other countries. The message identifies the bearer as a citizen of the issuing country, requests that he or she be allowed to enter and pass through the other country, and requests further that, when necessary, he or she be given help consistent with international norms. In Cuban passports, the message is in Spanish, French and English. The message is:

in Spanish:
La autoridad que expide el presente pasaporte en nombre del Gobierno de la República de Cuba, certifica que el Titular es ciudadano cubano y en tal virtud solicita a las autoridades civiles y militares de los países por donde transite le presten la asistencia y protección necesarias.

in French:
L'autorité qui émet le présent passeport au nom du Gouvernment de la République de Cuba certifie que son titulaire est citoyen cubain et, en foi de quoi, prie les autorités civiles et militaires des pays où voyage le porteur de bien vouloir lui prêter l'assistance et la protection nécessaire.

and in English:
The authority issuing the present passport on behalf of the Government of the Republic of Cuba certifies that the bearer is a Cuban citizen and, in virtue of this, requests the civil and military authorities of the countries through which he travels to provide him with whatever protection and assistance he needs.

Security features
In addition to coloured fibers in all common pages, Cuban passports feature a UV-reaction-based mark of the Cuban flag and the words República de Cuba (Spanish for Republic of Cuba) on the front endpaper.

Visa requirements map

As of 1 January 2017, Cuban citizens had visa-free or visa on arrival access to 60 countries and territories, ranking the Cuban passport 76th in terms of travel freedom according to the Henley visa restrictions index.

See also
 Visa requirements for Cuban citizens
 Cuban passport information on PRADO

References

Government of Cuba
Passports by country